Upgrade, Inc. is an American neobank founded in 2016. It has raised $600 million in equity funding and made over $10 billion in loans since its launch in 2017. Upgrade is headquartered in San Francisco, California with offices in Phoenix, Arizona and Montreal, Quebec, Canada. The company offers credit and banking products to consumers and delivers fixed-rate credit cards and loans. The company's other services include credit monitoring and education tools.

Upgrade was founded by Renaud Laplanche, founder and former CEO of LendingClub, and other former colleagues from Lending Club in August 2016. The company began offering loans in April 2017 and raised $60 million Series A funding round.

In April 2018, at the LendIt Conference in San Francisco, Upgrade announced a personal credit line for customers, a hybrid of a credit card and personal loan.

In October 2019 Upgrade launched Upgrade Card, which combines credit card acceptance with installment payments flexibility.

In June 2020, Upgrade received a $1 billion valuation in a Series D equity round led by Santander Group.

In August 2021, Upgrade raised $105 million in a Series E funding round led by Koch Disruptive Technologies, valuing the company at $3.3 billion.

In September 2021, the Nilson Report recognized Upgrade as the fastest-growing credit card in the US at the time.

In November 2021, CNBC reported that Upgrade grew 83% in valuation over four months to $6.28 billion after raising $280 million in a Series F funding round led by Coatue Management and DST Global.

References 

Financial services companies established in 2016
Financial services companies based in California